In combat sports, the north–south position (also known as north/south or four quarter) is a ground grappling position where one combatant is supine, with the other combatant invertedly lying prone on top, normally with their head over the bottom combatant's chest. The north–south position is a dominant position, where the top combatant can apply effective strikes such as knee strikes to the head, or easily transition into various grappling holds or more dominant positions. Transitioning into side control can be done by first switching into a particular hold known as ushiro-kesa-gatame (後袈裟固) or reverse scarf hold, where the chest points to the side, and the opponent's arm is controlled similarly to kesa-gatame. The north–south choke is employed exclusively from this position.

Kami shiho gatame

Kami shiho gatame (上四方固, "upper four quarter hold down"), and its variations kuzure kami shiho gatame (崩上四方固, "broken upper four quarter hold down"), are the most common pinning holds applied from the north–south position in combat sports using a gi. Kami shiho gatame involves pinning the opponent's arms to his or her side, typically by grabbing the opponent's belt and using the arms to press the arms of the opponent inwards. Kuzure-kami-shiho-gatame is similar, except that one or both arms of the opponent aren't pinned to the side, but can be controlled by for instance pinning them in between an upper arm and a knee.

Kami shiho gatame is one of the seven mat holds,
Osaekomi-waza,
of Kodokan Judo.
In grappling terms,
it is categorized as a north–south hold.

Shiho gatame is also one of the 25 techniques of Danzan Ryu's
constriction arts, Shimete, list.

Technique description 
Graphic
from http://judoinfo.com/techdrw.htm

A straight over throw naturally leads to kami shiho gatame.

Exemplar Videos:
Demonstrated
from https://web.archive.org/web/20060913144731/http://www.abbotsfordjudo.com/techniques/5thkyu.htm
Instructional Video

Escapes 
Ebi (Shrimp) Kami-Shiho-Gatame Escape
Circling Bridge/Roll-over Kami-Shiho-Gatame Escape

Included systems 
Systems:
Brazilian Jiu-Jitsu
Kodokan Judo, Judo Lists
Danzan Ryu, Danzan Ryu Lists
Lists:
The Canon Of Judo
Judo technique

Similar techniques, variants, and aliases 
Japanese aliases:
Sei kami shiho gatame(正上四方固)
English aliases:
Upper four quarter hold down
Top four corner hold
The NSFW(Not Safe For Work) Position 
Variants:
DZR's Shiho-Gatame
Sitting Kami-Shiho-Gatame
Embracing Kami-Shiho-Gatame
Kuzure kami shiho gatame

See also
 Back mount
 Guard
 Half guard
 Knee-on-stomach
 Mount
 Side control

References

 Løvstad, Jakob. The Mixed Martial Arts Primer. www.idi.ntnu.no. URL last accessed March 6, 2006. (DOC format)
 Ohlenkamp, Neil. Judo Grappling Techniques. judoinfo.com. URL last accessed March 6, 2006.
 Page, Nicky. Groundfighting 101. homepage.ntlworld.com. URL last accessed March 4, 2006.

External links

 North–South (Monson) Choke Video
 Judo pinning techniques Contains images of kami-shio-gatame and six variations of kuzure-kami-shiho-gatame. (Dutch)
 Kimura/Neck Crank from North and South Position
 North–south position Image of the north–south position without a gi.
 North–south to Mount Transition

Grappling positions
Brazilian jiu-jitsu techniques